Astor River, in Pakistan's Gilgit-Baltistan administrative region, is a tributary of the Indus River and one of the rivers draining the Deosai Plateau, running through Astore Valley. The river originates from western slopes of Burzil Pass.

Astor river joins Gilgit River at coordinates .

Footnotes

External links
 http://www.britannica.com/EBchecked/topic/39879/Astor-River

Rivers of Gilgit-Baltistan
Tributaries of the Indus River
Astore District
Rivers of Pakistan